Mauregard is a commune in the Seine-et-Marne department in the Île-de-France region in north-central France.

Parts of the Charles de Gaulle International Airport (France's largest and busiest airport) are located in Mauregard, including Terminal 1 and Terminal 3. The large airport property (over ) straddles land in three départements and six communes, with the Roissy-en-France commune providing its alternate name of Roissy Airport.

Demographics
Inhabitants are called Mauregaulois.

Education
There is a single preschool and elementary school, Ecole de Mauregard.

See also
Communes of the Seine-et-Marne department

References

External links

Home page 
1999 Land Use, from IAURIF (Institute for Urban Planning and Development of the Paris-Île-de-France région) 

Communes of Seine-et-Marne